Peter Price (born 17 August 1949 in Wrexham) is a Welsh former professional footballer (soccer player) who played professionally in England during the 1960s and 1970s.

Career

Early career
Price was one of that generation who bridged the gap between terminological eras, beginning his career as an inside forward and ending it as a striker despite playing a similar role throughout. 
He began his career as a youth at Liverpool, signing a full-time professional contract in 1966.

Peterborough United
In 1968, having failed to break into the Liverpool first team, he joined Peterborough United, for whom he scored 62 goals in 119 appearances.

Portsmouth
In 1972, Price signed for Portsmouth. Hampered by a back injury, he struggled to establish himself in the side, eventually leaving Fratton Park to return to his former club two years later.

Barnsley
He ended his career at Barnsley, making his final appearance in the spring of 1978.

International career

While at Peterborough, Price played for the Welsh under-23 side, scoring the winning goal against Scotland at Swansea City's Vetch Field ground.

References

1949 births
Living people
Footballers from Wrexham
Welsh footballers
Liverpool F.C. players
Peterborough United F.C. players
Barnsley F.C. players
Wales under-23 international footballers
Association football forwards